Yelshat Ukbenova (born 28 February 1994) is a Kazakhstani handball player. She plays for the club Almaty Region Handball and is member of the Kazakhstani national team. She competed at the 2015 World Women's Handball Championship in Denmark.

References

1994 births
Living people
Kazakhstani female handball players
21st-century Kazakhstani women